The Guatemala Post Office Building is a building in Guatemala City, Guatemala. It is the management centre of postal services in Guatemala. It was constructed between 1937 and 1940.

The characteristic archway of the building was inspired by the Santa Catalina Arch in Antigua Guatemala.

References

External links
 Photoglobe

Arches and vaults
Government buildings in Guatemala
Guatemala City
Communications in Guatemala
Palaces